Massimo Citi (born 1955) is an Italian science fiction writer and reviewer. He was born in Brescia, in Lombardy in northern Italy, and has published a number of stories on various magazines and anthologies. He is a co-editor of the literary magazine LN LibriNuovi, a co-editor of the yearly anthology, Fata Morgana, and manages a bookstore.

He won the Premio Omelas 2002 which Amnesty International Italia devoted to science fiction and human rights.

External links
 http://www.fantascienza.com/magazine/notizie/3560/fata-morgana-a-torino/
 http://www.fantascienza.com/magazine/libri/9974/in-controtempo/
 http://www.fantascienza.com/magazine/notizie/3194/omelas-finalmente-i-finalisti/

1955 births
Living people
Italian science fiction writers
Italian male writers